Ciro Carlos Araujo de Quadros (January 30, 1940 – May 28, 2014) was a Brazilian leader in the field of Public Health, in particular, the area of vaccines and preventable diseases. He was born in Rio Pardo, Brazil.

Eradication of polio
De Quadros played a critical role in developing the strategies now used worldwide in the eradication of polio.
He led the team which eradicated polio from the Americas. He received a Medical Doctor degree from the Federal University for Health Sciences (UFCSPA), Porto Alegre, Brazil, 1966, and a M.P.H. degree from the National School of Public Health, Rio de Janeiro, Brazil, 1968.

Later work
In 2003, de Quadros joined the Sabin Vaccine Institute, a non-profit organization honoring the legacy of Albert Sabin, developer of the oral polio vaccine.  de Quadros is instrumental in the Institute's international immunization advocacy programs, where he works on issues such as the introduction of new vaccines, e.g. rotavirus, rubella, human papilloma virus, pneumococcal and others, and on issues related to the sustainability of national immunization programs. He is also on the faculty at Johns Hopkins School of Hygiene and Public Health and the School of Medicine of the George Washington University.

Death
He died of pancreatic cancer on May 28, 2014 at his home in Washington, D.C.

Public Health Awards
He published and presented at conferences throughout the world and received a number of international awards, including:
 the 1993 Prince Mahidol Award of Thailand
 the 2000 Albert B. Sabin Gold Medal
 The Order of Rio Branco from his native Brazil
 election to the National Institute of Medicine
 2011 BBVA Foundation Frontiers of Knowledge Award of Development Cooperation for leading efforts to eliminate polio and measles from the western hemisphere and being one of the most important scientists in the eradication of smallpox around the world. His work has shown that vaccination programs can be carried out in an economically sustainable way.
 Public Health Hero of the Americas award from the Pan-American Health Organization (2014)
 Geneva Forum for Health Award (2014)
 Featured in PAHO's Art for Research exhibit collection by photographer Theo Chalmers "Shaping the World", highlighting how research for health drives social and economic development. The collection Shaping the World that has been exhibited in Africa, Europe and throughout the Americas.

See also
 Sabin Vaccine Institute

References

External links
 The burden of pneumococcal disease among Latin American and Caribbean children: review of the evidence.Rev Panam Salud Pública. 2009 Mar;25(3):270-9. Review. Accessed on: 11/08/2013
 Cost-effectiveness of pneumococcal conjugate vaccination in Latin America and the Caribbean: a regional analysis.Rev Panam Salud Pública. 2008 Nov;24(5):304-13. Accessed on: 11/08/2013
 Identifying unit costs for use in regional economic evaluation: an illustrative analysis of childhood pneumococcal conjugate vaccine in Latin America and the Caribbean. Rev Panam Salud Pública. 2009 Nov;26(5):458-68. Accessed on: 11/08/2013
 Rational use of rubella vaccine for prevention of congenital rubella syndrome in the Americas. Review. Rev Panam Salud Pública. 1998 Sep;4(3):156-60. Accessed on: 11/08/2013
 Accelerated rubella control and the prevention of congenital rubella syndrome. Rev Panam Salud Pública. 2002 Apr;11(4): 273-6. Accessed on: 11/08/2013
 Shaping the World, an art exhibit of the Pan American Health Organization highlighting how research for health improves people's life and human development, and yields high returns on investment.

1940 births
2014 deaths
Brazilian public health doctors
Polio
Vaccinologists
People from Rio Grande do Sul
Members of the National Academy of Medicine